Fernando Meligeni and Jaime Oncins were the defending champions, but did not participate this year.

Arnaud Clément and Sébastien Grosjean won in the final 7–6(7–4), 6–4, against Lars Burgsmüller and Andrew Painter.

Seeds

Draw

Draw

External links
Draw

2000 ATP Tour
2000 Grand Prix Hassan II